Phylloblastia fortuita is a species of foliicolous (leaf-dwelling) lichen in the family Verrucariaceae. Found in Western Europe and North America, it was formally described as a new species in 2009 by Esteve Llop and Antonio Gómez-Bolea. The lichen, originally documented as occurring in the Mediterranean climate of the Iberian Peninsula, was reported from Marin County, California, in 2016. Other plants from which it has been documented include Buxus sempervirens, Hedera helix, Quercus ilex, and, in North America, Sequoia sempervirens.

The greenish-grey thallus of Phylloblastia fortuita is thin and diffuse–somewhat similar to a cobweb. Its perithecia are greyish-brown to dark brown in colour and typically measure 0.1–0.2 mm in diameter and are up to 0.1 mm high. The ascospores, which number eight per ascus, have an ellipsoid to spindle shape (fusiform), with usual dimensions of 20–35 by 5–9 μm. They have between 5 and 9 transverse septa and from 1 to 6 longitudinal septa, which divides the spores into several compartments.

References

Verrucariales
Lichens described in 2009
Lichen species
Lichens of the Southwestern United States
Lichens of Southwestern Europe